Jason Altmire (born March 7, 1968) is an American businessman, author, lobbyist and politician. He is a fellow of the European Institute for International Law and International Relations. He is a member of the Democratic Party.

Prior to entering Congress, Altmire worked as a healthcare industry lobbyist. Notably for a Democrat, he voted against President Barack Obama's landmark legislation, the Affordable Care Act, in 2010. After leaving Congress in 2013, he has worked for health insurance companies and health care business consulting firms.

Early life and education
Altmire was born in western Pennsylvania, where he was raised an only child in a single parent home. A record-breaking high school athlete, he set a school record in track and field and was recognized as an all-star wide receiver in football before a serious knee injury kept him off the athletic field as a senior. In 1986, he matriculated at Florida State University, in Tallahassee. Following a lengthy rehabilitation of his knee injury, he tried out for and made the Seminole football team as a walk on, frequently working in practice against legendary defensive back Deion Sanders. He graduated in 1990 with a B.S. in Political Science and worked in the Tallahassee campaign office of Pete Peterson, then a candidate for Congress in Florida's Second Congressional District. He later earned a Master's in Health Administration from George Washington University in Washington, D.C. In 2020, he completed a Doctorate in Business Administration from the University of Florida

Early career

Politics 
After Pete Peterson won the 1990 congressional race against incumbent Republican Congressman Bill Grant, he hired Altmire to work in his Capitol Hill office. Altmire worked as a legislative assistant during Peterson's three terms in office (1991–1996), specializing in domestic policy issues. In 1993, Altmire was appointed to a working group for President Bill Clinton’s Task Force on National Health Care Reform.

Health care industry lobbyist 
In 1996, when Peterson was named U.S. Ambassador to Vietnam, Altmire continued his work in health care policy by taking a job as a lobbyist for the Federation of American Hospitals.

In 1998, Altmire returned to Western Pennsylvania to work as a lobbyist for the University of Pittsburgh Medical Center (UPMC). By 2005, he was the acting Vice President for Government Relations and Community Health Services.

In 2003 he was named by Pittsburgh Magazine as one of Pittsburgh's "40 under 40", and in 2005 he was awarded the Arcadia Award by Northern Allegheny Chamber of Commerce.

Political career

Elections 
Altmire left UPMC in June 2005 to run against three-term incumbent Republican U.S. Congresswoman Melissa Hart of Pennsylvania's 4th congressional district, who was considered by most observers to be invulnerable. In May 2006, Altmire won the Democratic primary, defeating millionaire businesswoman Georgia Berner, 55%–45%. In the 2006 general election, Altmire campaigned relentlessly and raised over $1 million to help fund his race against Hart. After polling well behind Hart early in the race, he eventually closed the gap heading into the final weeks before the election. Altmire defeated Hart, 52%–48%. In 2008, Hart ran again in a rematch but was defeated by Altmire 56%–44%, even as John McCain carried the district by almost 11 points.

In the historic 2010 wave election that saw Democrats lose 63 seats in the U.S. House, including five in Pennsylvania, Altmire survived. He was re-elected to a third term, defeating attorney Keith Rothfus, 51%–49%. Following the 2010 census, Pennsylvania lost one congressional seat. The Republican-controlled state legislature dismantled Altmire's district, and most of its territory was merged with the neighboring 12th District, represented by fellow Democratic congressman Mark Critz, who defeated Altmire 51% to 49% in the primary election. Critz went on to lose the 2012 general election to Rothfus, Altmire's 2010 opponent.

Tenure
Altmire is a moderate Democrat. He did not miss a single vote during his first two terms and continued the unbroken voting streak into his sixth year in office, which was the longest House voting streak during that time. The streak finally ended at 4734 consecutive votes when Altmire attended a White House ceremony for Leslie H. Sabo Jr. a former resident of Altmire's district who was posthumously awarded the Medal of Honor by President Obama. Over the course of his six years in office, Altmire returned more than $1 million in unspent office funds, citing a desire to lead by example and be a steward of taxpayer money.

Altmire successfully fought to guarantee the enlistment bonuses of combat-wounded veterans, and he forced a 2007 policy change allowing Vietnam-era Gold Star families access to White House tours after a constituent was denied. He made several trips to the Middle East during his time in office, visiting U.S. troops and meeting with foreign leaders in Yemen, Iraq, and Israel, among other countries.

Altmire opposed the use of Chinese-made steel in the construction of the U.S.- Mexico border fence. Following the devastating 2010 earthquake in Haiti, Altmire helped in the rescue of two constituents and the 54 orphans under their care. He also authored the legislation that ended the late enrollment penalty for low-income seniors participating in the Medicare Part D program.

During the 2008 presidential primary election, Democratic candidate Hillary Clinton sought Altmire's support as a superdelegate. Altmire did not endorse a candidate in the race and remained neutral throughout the primary. According to the book HRC: State Secrets by Jonathan Allen and Amie Parnes, this could be a reason why Bill Clinton campaigned against Altmire four years later, when the congressman was involved in a contested primary election of his own.

Altmire voted against the Affordable Care Act on March 21, 2010; he had also voted against earlier versions of the bill. His vote on final passage of the bill was highly sought after by President Obama and Democratic congressional leaders. According to Washington Post health care policy writer CeCi Connolly, "Altmire, more than most in Congress, understood the intricacies of health-care policy. As a congressional aide in the 1990s, he had worked on Clinton's failed effort and later became a hospital executive." Days before the vote on final passage of the bill, President Obama had personally tried to persuade Altmire, telling him "I want to give you something to think about before the vote. Picture yourself on Monday morning. You wake up and look at the paper. It's the greatest thing Congress has done in 50 years. And you were on the wrong team." After leaving Congress in 2013, Altmire became the executive of a Florida health insurance company and expressed support for the Affordable Care Act.

From 2007 to 2010, he served as chairman of the House Small Business Subcommittee on Oversight and Investigation, during which time he took the lead in passing through the House his legislation to help small businesses acquire private capital investment. As chairman, he introduced legislation to assist small businesses affected by deployments of employees serving in the United States National Guard. The bill garnered widespread bipartisan support and was signed into law by President George W. Bush in 2008.

Committee assignments
Committee on Education and the Workforce
Subcommittee on Higher Education and Workforce Training
Health, Employment, Labor, and Pensions Subcommittee
Committee on Transportation and Infrastructure
Subcommittee on Highways and Transit
Subcommittee on Railroads, Pipelines, and Hazardous Materials
Subcommittee on Water Resources and Environment
Committee on Small Business
Subcommittee on Oversight and Investigations, Chairman 2007-2010

Later career
In January 2013, Altmire began work as a lobbyist and public relations executive for the health insurance company Florida Blue. During his time there, he worked to implement of the Affordable Care Act in Florida. In 2015, he was appointed chairman of the Florida Blue Foundation, the philanthropy associated with Florida's Blue Cross Blue Shield Company. In August 2017, he left the company in order to promote his book, Dead Center: How Political Polarization Divided America And What We Can Do About It. In February 2019, Altmire was named a senior advisor to the health care consulting firm Avalere Health.

Since leaving office, Altmire has remained active in civic and national affairs, serving on several boards, including the U.S. Global Leadership Coalition, college football's Outback Bowl, and the board of trustees at Jacksonville University. In 2014, he was appointed by Florida Governor Rick Scott to serve on the state's business and economic development board.

In 2019, he helped to author a report published by the Center for the Study of the Presidency and Congress, recommending reforms to the American political system. He also co-chairs the Advisory Board for the political reform group Unite America, and is a member of the Issue One ReFormers Caucus, a group of former members of Congress dedicated to civility in politics.

He and his wife, Kelly, have endowed a permanent scholarship at Florida State University, awarded annually to a health policy student “who demonstrates ambition and maturity through campus involvement and leadership, internships, employment, community service, faculty recommendations and/or overcoming significant challenges.“

Book
Altmire, Jason (2017) How Political Polarization Divided America and What We Can Do About It, Sunbury Press,

Archive 
Altmire's papers and records from his time in public service are housed at the University of Pittsburgh. The collection includes nearly 36,000 files, consisting of official government publications, administrative files, travel files, constituent communications, correspondence, daily schedules, speeches, invitations, photographs, video, copies of legislation, memorabilia, talking points, congressional communications, committee hearing testimony, campaign materials, and press clippings. Altmire's congressional and campaign websites were selected by the Library of Congress to be included in its permanent historical collection on the U.S. Congress, and the websites’ contents from various points during Altmire's four congressional campaigns and tenure in office are archived there.

References

External links 

U.S. Congressman Jason Altmire official U.S. House website
Committees: Education and Labor, Small Business Transportation and Infrastructure
Altmire for Congress official campaign website
 
Profile at SourceWatch

1968 births
Florida State Seminoles football players
Florida State University alumni
Milken Institute School of Public Health alumni
Living people
Democratic Party members of the United States House of Representatives from Pennsylvania
People from Kittanning, Pennsylvania
People from McCandless, Pennsylvania
21st-century American politicians
Warrington College of Business alumni